Sukhdeo Paswan (born 5 November 1953) is an Indian politician. He is a five-term Member of Parliament from the Araria constituency of Bihar. He was last an MP in the 14th Lok Sabha of India as a member of the Bharatiya Janata Party. In July 2010, he joined the Lok Janshakti Party.

References

1953 births
Indian National Congress politicians
Living people
India MPs 2004–2009
People from Araria
India MPs 1989–1991
India MPs 1991–1996
India MPs 1996–1997
India MPs 1999–2004
Lok Sabha members from Bihar
Lok Janshakti Party politicians
Janata Dal politicians
Bharatiya Janata Party politicians from Bihar